St. Paul's Episcopal Church is a historic Episcopal church in Haymarket, Virginia, United States. It was started in 1801 and is a two-story, gable-roofed brick church building. The building originally served as the district courthouse for Fairfax, Fauquier, Loudon, and Prince William counties.  It later housed Hygeia Academy.  It was consecrated as a church in 1834, and remodeled in 1867, after being gutted during the American Civil War.  The remodeling added the frame chancel, bracketed cornice, and octagonal belfry and spire.

It was added to the National Register of Historic Places in 1975.

References

19th-century Episcopal church buildings
Buildings and structures in Prince William County, Virginia
Churches completed in 1867
Episcopal churches in Virginia
National Register of Historic Places in Prince William County, Virginia
Churches on the National Register of Historic Places in Virginia